Sërbicë e Poshtme is a village in the Prizren Municipality in southern Kosovo.

History
First mentioned in a chrysobull by the Serbian Emperor Stefan Dušan in 1348, Sërbicë e Poshtme was known for having a well which supplied water to the surround villages. In 1940 the remains of an old church and cemetery were discovered in the village. In 1997, reconstruction and restoration works were conducted by the local Serbs who managed to rebuild the foundations of the church. However, in 1999 following the end of the Kosovo War, the church was destroyed. 

A 1940 census of the village listed it as having 42 households in total. It consisted of 16 Serb (Christian Orthodox), 11 Muslim, 9 Albanian (6 of the Catholic faith, 3 of the Islamic faith), 5 Roma (Muslim faith) and 1 Turkish households:
Serb - Djordjevic (2 homes), Cardaklije (2 homes), Bajkic (3 homes), Ljubisavci (1 home), Tomic (1 home), Borobanci (5 homes), Jovanovic (1 home), Markovic (1 home).
Muslim - Cardaklije (3 homes), Isenovic (1 home), Zejnelovic (1 home), Abazovic (3 homes).
Albanian - Muslim: Salja (1 home), Malici (1 home), Zecirovic (1 home); Catholic: Miriditi (6 homes).
Roma - Unknown surname (5 homes). 
Turkish - Alimovic (1 home).

Demographics 
The village has a Kosovo Albanian majority.

Notes and references 

Notes:

References:

Villages in Prizren